Merry Edwards is a Californian winery, established in 1997. It is noted for its Pinot noirs in the Russian River Valley AVA of Sonoma County.

References

External links
Official site 

Wineries in Sonoma County
1997 establishments in California
American companies established in 1997